Koma Station or Kōma Station is the name of two train stations in Japan:

 Koma Station (Saitama) - (高麗駅) in Saitama Prefecture
 Kōma Station (Iwate) - (好摩駅) in Iwate Prefecture